Mountain Plains is an unincorporated area and census-designated place (CDP) in Lawrence County, South Dakota, United States. The population was 327 at the 2020 census. It was first listed as a CDP prior to the 2020 census.

It is in the northern part of the county, on the northern edge of the Black Hills. It is bordered to the north by the city of Spearfish. U.S. Route 14A forms the eastern edge of the CDP, following the canyon of Spearfish Creek.

Demographics

References 

Census-designated places in Lawrence County, South Dakota
Census-designated places in South Dakota